Philip Louis Kelly (9 September 1886 – 30 March 1954) was an Australian politician.

He was born at Deloraine in Tasmania. In 1922 he was elected to the Tasmanian House of Assembly as a Labor member for Darwin in a recount following James Ogden's resignation. In 1934 he was appointed Chair of Committees, a position he held until his defeat in 1946. Kelly died in Ulverstone in 1954.

References

1886 births
1954 deaths
Members of the Tasmanian House of Assembly
Australian Labor Party members of the Parliament of Tasmania
20th-century Australian politicians